Endless Nights is an album released in 2007 by Marcos Hernandez.

Track listing
Red Dress (I Just Wanna Know Her)
Change Your Mind
Jump Into It
Endless Nights
Consumeda En Fuego
Ride
Empty
Shine
Letter
Pair of Apologies
I'm Not Used To That
Never Lie
Falls Down
Time To Let Go
We'll Never Know
Handz
Your Head Will Seek
See Ya
Goodbye

References
http://cdbaby.com/cd/marcosh2

2007 albums
Marcos Hernandez (singer) albums